Kalt-e Olya (also Romanized as Kalt-e ‘Olyā; also known as Kalt-e Bālā and Koltābād) is a village in Qatur Rural District, Qatur District, Khoy County, West Azerbaijan Province, Iran. At the 2006 census, its population was 292, in 50 families.

References 

Populated places in Khoy County